Bangladesh Institute of Philatelic Studies is a research institution in Bangladesh that researches postage stamps of Bangladesh.

History
The Bangladesh Institute of Philatelic Studies was founded in 1988. Siddique Mahmudar Rahman was the first director of the institute. The institute in 2004 published the first interactive database of Bangladesh stamps on a compact disk.

Publications

References

Research institutes in Bangladesh
1988 establishments in Bangladesh
Philatelic organizations
Organisations based in Dhaka